Popper is a surname.

Notable people with the name include:

 Albert Popper (1808–1889), Mayor of Vimperk and official doctor of the Schwarzenberg Princes
 Ami Popper (born 1969), convicted murderer
 Catherine Popper (born 1973), rock musician
 David Popper (1843–1913), Bohemian composer and cellist
 David H. Popper (1912–2008), American diplomat
 Erwin Popper (1879–1955), Austrian physician
 Frank Popper (1918–2020), art historian
 Frank J. Popper (born 1944), Rutgers urban planner
 Ilona Novák-Popper (1925-2019), Hungarian swimmer 
 Joachim Edler von Popper (1722–1795), Court Jew and lessee of the Habsburg tobacco monopoly
 John Popper (born 1967), musician and songwriter
 Josef Popper (1838–1921), Austrian engineer and author
 Julius Popper (1857–1893), Romanian explorer
 Karl Popper (1902–1994), philosopher of science, defender of liberal democracy
 Ota Pavel (1930–1973), Czech author (born Otto Popper)
 Robert Popper (born 1967), comedy producer, writer and actor
 Siegfried Popper (1848–1933), Austrian naval constructor
 Meir ben Judah Leib Poppers (ca 1624–1662), Bohemian rabbi and Kabbalist

Jewish surnames